Integra Technologies is an Outsourced Semiconductor Assembly And Test (OSAT) service provider headquartered in Wichita, Kansas, United States.  It provides semiconductor wafer testing / dicing / grinding, integrated circuit (IC) packaging and testing, reliability and qualification, counterfeit detection, and related services to semiconductor companies, as well as to Department of Defense and space programs.  Currently, facilities are located in Wichita and Milpitas, California (within Silicon Valley).

Integra is an accredited supplier recommended by the Defense Microelectronics Activity (DMEA) laboratory for post processing, packaging, assembly, and testing of ICs for use by Department of Defense (DoD) programs.  It has provided services for more than 100 DoD programs, and various space applications including the Mars rover, Hubble Space Telescope, Orion (spacecraft).

History
 1983 - NCR founded their CETC (Component Evaluation Technology Center) group.
 1991 - AT&T acquired NCR, then CETC becomes part of Bell Labs.
 1996 - AT&T underwent a court ordered trivestiture by splitting into three independent companies: AT&T, NCR, Lucent.  AT&T spun off Bell Labs and CETC into Lucent Technologies.
 1998 - Lucent spun off CETC into the new company named Integra Technologies.
 2000 - Amkor Technology acquired Integra Technologies.
 2005 - Amkor spun off Integra Technologies, again.
 2008 - Integra becomes employee owned.
 2013 - Integra acquired Analytical Solutions Incorporated (ASI) in Albuquerque, New Mexico next to Kirtland Air Force Base near Sandia National Laboratories. It provided failure analysis, construction analysis, destructive physical analysis, non-destructive testing, and counterfeit investigation of semiconductor devices.
 2017 - Integra acquired CORWIL Technology based in Milpitas, California. It was founded in 1990 to provide IC assembly and test services.
 2019 - Integra announced it moved it's corporate offices into a new 14,000 sq ft facility in Wichita, and will house administrative, sales, and support staff.
 2021 - Integra opened a 2,700 square foot lab expansion housing 15 new pieces of specialized test equipment.
 2022 - The Integra Albuquerque facility (previously Analytical Solutions) was moved to its Wichita facilities.
 2022 - Integra acquired Presto Engineering test assests.
 2023 - Integra proposes a $1.8 billion total capital investment for a one million square foot IC assembly & test facility and headquarters in the Wichita metro area that would provide at least 2000 new jobs.  Integra would receive $304.2 million in public incentives from Kansas.  Most of the funds would comes from the federal CHIPS and Science Act to boost domestic manufacturing of semiconductors in the United States.  The proposed site would be located at the southeast corner of K-254 highway and Rock Road in Bel Aire, a suburb northeast of Wichita.
 2023 - Integra announced they will be opening a training center at 3718 N. Rock Road in Wichita, also it will serve as their interim headquarters until the new large building is completed.

Facilities
The following is a list of Integra's facilities and future facilities:
 K-254 highway and Rock Rd in Bel Aire, Kansas - future  facility & headquarters, construction not started yet
 3718 N. Rock Rd in Wichita, Kansas - soon to be training center and interim headquarters
 3450 N. Rock Rd in Wichita, Kansas
 1635 McCarthy Blvd in Milpitas, California (within Silicon Valley)

See also
 Semiconductor industry
 Semiconductor device fabrication
 Integrated circuit packaging
 Fabless manufacturing

References

External links
 
 Integra FAQ
 What is Integra Technologies? CEO shares plans for $1.8B Wichita facility - KWCH TV 12
 Integra Pushes Its Chip All-In - Wichita Business Journal

Companies based in Wichita, Kansas
Manufacturing companies based in Kansas
Semiconductor companies of the United States
Assembly and Test semiconductor companies